Southgate is a surname. Notable people with the surname include:
 Colin Southgate (1938–2021), English businessman and Royal Opera House chairman
 Donald W. Southgate (1887–1953), American architect
 Dorothy Southgate (1889-1946) British organist and composer
 Elsie Southgate (1890–1946), British violinist and composer
 F. G. Southgate, British architect, engineer and surveyor
 Gareth Southgate (born 1970), English footballer and manager
 Horatio Southgate (1812–1894), American Episcopal priest
 Hugh McLellan Southgate (1871–1940), of Washington, D.C.
 Ivan Southgate, former name of Terri Rogers (1937–1999), English ventriloquist
 James H. Southgate (1859–1916), American spokesman for prohibition
 Jan Southgate (born 1955), English cricketer
 John Southgate (1926–1999), English clergyman
 Martha Southgate, American novelist
 Matthew Southgate (born 1988), English golfer
 Maurice Southgate (1913–1990), British army officer
 Richard Southgate (politician) (1774–1857), American attorney and politician
 Richard Southgate (clergyman) (1729–1795), English clergyman and numismatist
 Tony Southgate (born 1940), British engineer and racing car designer
 Troy Southgate (born 1965), British political activist
 Vaughan Southgate (born 1944), British medical parasitologist
 William Southgate (born 1941), New Zealand conductor and composer
 William Wright Southgate (1800–1849), American politician

See also 
 Southgate (disambiguation)